This is a list of the National Register of Historic Places listings in Refugio County, Texas.

This is intended to be a complete list of properties listed on the National Register of Historic Places in Refugio County, Texas. There are four properties listed on the National Register in the county. One property is also a Recorded Texas Historic Landmark.

Current listings

The locations of National Register properties may be seen in a mapping service provided.

|}

See also

National Register of Historic Places listings in Texas
Recorded Texas Historic Landmarks in Refugio County

External links

References

Refugio County, Texas
Refugio County
Buildings and structures in Refugio County, Texas